New Berlin West Middle/High School is a public middle/high school located in New Berlin, Wisconsin. It is a part of the School District of New Berlin.  The school serves grades 7 through 12. The school colors are blue and gold, and the school mascot is the Viking.

From 2001 through 2007, the school underwent major construction, including a new theater, a new fieldhouse with an indoor track and tennis courts, an upgraded and relocated library, and a new 10-classroom wing. Renovations were also made to the bathrooms and workout facilities. The class of 2007 was the first to host graduation in the new fieldhouse.

Athletics 

West has a rivalry with the other New Berlin public high school, Eisenhower.

New Berlin West's 2010 baseball team made it to the state tournament for the first time. The school's 2013 baseball team won the state tournament for the first time.

State championships
 1984 - Girls' volleyball
 2000 - Boys' basketball
 2013 - Boys' baseball
 2016 - Girls' softball
 2018 - Girls’ Pom and Dance

2018 Anti-Semitic allegations
In 2018, New Berlin West halted its yearbook distribution after the school learned that a senior student chose a yearbook quote referring to the Holocaust. His quote read, "There will always be one true Final Solution." A spokesman of the Milwaukee Jewish Federation was on record as finding the quote "very disturbing and upsetting". Terribly disappointing.

Hall Of Fame 
This is the current athletic hall of fame for New Berlin West Middle/High School.

12h Annual Hall of Fame Inductees, 2021* (J Napoli)

 Daniel Nettesheim – Class of 1964
 Dave Nyenhuis – Class of 1991
 Meredith Sweeney – Class of 2004
 Ben Wisniewski – Class of 2008
 Ben Falls – Class of 2009
 Elizabeth Radtke – Class of 2009
 Tom Farina - Coach (Retired 2019)

11th Annual Hall of Fame Inductees, 2019 (J Napoli)

 Tom Koch – Class of 1969
 Jude Pierson – Class of 1997
 Caitlin Moore – Class of 2008
 Mike Dillett – Coach (2009)
 Chris Rink – Booster & Service 2019

10th Annual Hall of Fame Inductees, 2018 (J Napoli)

 Tom Kolb – Class of 1971
 John Mitich – Class of 1991
 Chris Peske – Class of 1980
 Andrew Monigal – Class of 2002

9th Annual Hall of Fame Inductees, 2017 (J Napoli)

 Jeff Eckmann – Class of 1970
 Tom Daluga – 1972 – 2006
 Wesley Ladwig – Class of 2005
 Steve Chard – Service

8th Annual Hall of Fame Inductees, 2016 (J Napoli)

 Mike Kuglitsch – Class of 1978
 Alyssa Krueger – Class of 1998
 Mike Ivy – Class of 1994
 Kyle Kalkopf – Class of 2008
 Jason Chappell – Class of 2001

7th Annual Hall of Fame Inductees, 2015 (J Napoli)

 Tony Smith – Class of 2009
 Jon Chappell – Class of 2000
 Britany (Gustafson) Pfeifer – Class of 1999
 Jeff Lewiston – Coach (Retired 2014)
 Don & Debbie Marx – Service (1997-2016)

6th Annual Hall of Fame Inductees, 2014 (J Napoli)

 Jeff DeBacco – Class of 1978
 Pat O’Halloran – Coach, Football & Wrestling
 Vicki (Scheeler) Radichel – Class of 2003

5th Annual Hall of Fame Inductees, 2013 (J Kader)

 Bruce Erickson – Athletic Director 1964-1997
 Erika Erickson – Class of 1992
 Terri (Giyan) Kallsen – Class of 1986
 Doug Lange – Class of 1967 & Coach 1982-1998
 David Morley – Class of 1965

4th Annual Hall of Fame Inductees, 2012 (J Kader)

 Pete Gustafson – Coach 1972-2000
 Tierra Shirley – Class of 2002
 Mike White – Class of 1983

3rd Annual Hall of Fame Inductees 2011 (J Kader)

 David Foley, Class of 1983
 Jeff Krumrich, Coach 1967 – 2000
 Ken Lobins, Class of 1982
 Laura Marx, Class of 2004

2nd Annual Hall of Fame Inductees 2010 (T Farina)

 Patrick (Pat) Bodus, Class of 1973
 David Cortichiato, Class of 1993
 Kevin Jagiello, Class of 1984
 Robert Schreiber, Coach 1966 - 2005
 Sandra Rae (Wagner) Ellis, Class of 1970
 Jody Witty, Class of 1984
 Ryan Zahorik, Class of 1995

1st Annual Hall of Fame Inductees 2009 (T Farina)

 Charlie Averkamp, Class of 2004
 Rachel Ann (Barnes) McKinley, Class of 1988
 Kristin Becker, Class of 1986
 Beth Brochhausen, Class of 1986
 Ray Carney, Coach 1975 – 2005
 Gail Champion, Coach 1976 – 2000
 Jim Ellis, Class of 1974
 Scott Evans, Class of 1977
 Kory Hauser, Class of 1994
 Susan Kuglitsch, Class of 1982
 Dean Molinaro, Coach 1969 – 2000
 Kurt Peltzer, Class of 1987
 Jason Rutz, Class of 2003
 John (JJ) Tischer, Class of 1994
 George Zuniga, Class of 1965

References

External links

New Berlin West Middle/High School website

Public high schools in Wisconsin
Schools in Waukesha County, Wisconsin